The 1991 All-Big Eight Conference football team consists of American football players chosen by various organizations for All-Big Eight Conference teams for the 1991 NCAA Division I-A football season.  The selectors for the 1991 season included the Associated Press (AP).

Offensive selections

Quarterbacks
 Keithen McCant, Nebraska (AP-1)

Running backs
 Derek Brown, Nebraska (AP-1)
 Tony Sands, Kansas (AP-1)
 Mike Gaddis, Oklahoma (AP-1)

Tight ends
 Johnny Mitchell, Nebraska (AP-1)

Wide receivers
 Michael Smith, Kansas State (AP-1)

Centers
 Jay Leeuwenburg, Colorado (AP-1)

Offensive linemen
 Will Shields, Nebraska (AP-1)
 Chris Perez, Kansas (AP-1)
 Brian Boerboom, Nebraska (AP-1)
 Brian Brauninger, Oklahoma (AP-1)

Defensive selections

Defensive ends
 Reggie Barnes, Oklahoma (AP-1)
 Jason Gildon, Oklahoma State (AP-1)

Defensive lineman
 Joel Steed, Colorado (AP-1)
 Dana Stubblefield, Kansas (AP-1)
 Stacey Satterwhite, Oklahoma State (AP-1)

Linebackers
 Joe Bowden, Oklahoma (AP-1)
 Greg Biekert, Colorado (AP-1)
 Brooks Barta, Kansas State (AP-1)

Defensive backs
 Jason Belser, Oklahoma (AP-1)
 Eric Hamilton, Colorado (AP-1)
 Tyrone Legette, Nebraska (AP-1)

Special teams

Place-kicker
 Dan Eichloff, Kansas (AP-1)

Punter
 Dan Eichloff, Kansas (AP-1)

Key

AP = Associated Press

See also
 1991 College Football All-America Team

References

All-Big Seven Conference football team
All-Big Eight Conference football teams